Alec McDonald may refer to:

 Alec McDonald (footballer) (1882–1942), Australian rules footballer for Melbourne Football Club
 Alec McDonald (politician) (1878–1956), Australian politician, member of the Victorian Legislative Assembly for Stawell and Ararat

See also 
 Alec MacDonald, New Zealand rugby league player
 Alex McDonald (disambiguation)
 Alexander McDonald (disambiguation)